Richard C. Jasper (commonly known as “Dick") is a pioneering American gasser drag racer. With wins in 1957 and 1958, Jasper became just the second National Hot Rod Association (NHRA) two-time national classes champion, following Ralph Richter.

History 
Driving a Chevrolet-powered 1934 Ford, Jasper won the NHRA C/Gas (C/G) national title, Oklahoma City, Oklahoma, in 1957.

By winning two titles, Jasper became NHRA's second two-time national class champion.  He was the first to achieve it in C/G.

Notes

Sources
Davis, Larry. Gasser Wars, North Branch, MN:  Cartech, 2003, p. 181.

Dragster drivers
American racing drivers